"Find an Island" is a song by New Zealand musician Benee. It was released as a single on 11 October 2019 as the lead single from Benee's second extended play Stella & Steve. The song peaked at number 83 on the Australian ARIA Charts, becoming her first charting single in that territory.

About the song, Benee told Coup de Main magazine "The song is about a tiny little argument I had with my guitar player Tia. We had some weird little bicker, and you know when you’re having a petty argument with a friend you don't want to swear at them or put them down or anything, but I was like, 'What would I say?' It'd be like, 'Find an island, go somewhere else'."

Critical reception
Helen Ehrlich from Culture Affinity Magazine said with "Find an Island" Benee continues her pattern of dropping poppy and punchy songs". Ehrlich said "'Find An Island' is swinging and sultry song about removing negative people from your mind and life." Andrew Drever from Sydney Morning Herald called the song a "tropical slow-burner". In the EP review, Nathan Gunn from Tone Deaf described the song as "a cruisy summer track".

Charts

References

2019 singles
2019 songs
Benee songs
Republic Records singles
Songs written by Benee
Songs written by Djeisan Suskov
Songs written by Josh Fountain
Song recordings produced by Josh Fountain